Edgar John "Eggs" Manske (July 4, 1912 – January 27, 2002) was a professional American football player who played six seasons in the National Football League (NFL). Manske was the last college player to play without a football helmet. Manske played in two NFL championship games with the Chicago Bears, including the historic 1940 NFL Championship Game, a 73–0 victory over the Washington Redskins.

Early life and college career
Manske was born in 1912 in Nekoosa, Wisconsin.  He graduated from Alexander High School (renamed Nekoosa High School).

A member of the College Football Hall of Fame, Manske excelled in college at both football and basketball.  A three-year letterman at Northwestern, he began his football career as a walk-on, became a starter during his sophomore season after excelling as a substitute end in a 1930 game against Notre Dame, and ended his career as team Most Valuable Player in 1933.  Manske was elected to the All-Big Ten Conference and United Press International All-America teams in 1933.   He was also named to the All-Big Ten team in basketball in 1933. In his senior year, Manske played all sixty minutes against Ohio State, Notre Dame, Minnesota, and Illinois, and all but two minutes against Michigan.

NFL career
As part of the first College All-Star team to line up against the current NFL champions, Manske caught the eye of Chicago Bears coach George Halas during the surprising 1934 All-Star game; Manske performed well against starting Bears lineman George Musso. Halas eventually obtained Manske's services by trade with Philadelphia in 1937.

During his professional football career, Manske played at the end position.  Manske led the Philadelphia Eagles in scoring during the 1935 season; his picture appeared on a Wheaties box in 1936. As a member of the Chicago Bears, Manske played his last professional game in the memorable 73–0 playoff win over Washington.

Manske was involved in a trade considered among the most lopsided in NFL history.  In 1938, he was traded from Chicago to the Pittsburgh Pirates for the Pirates' first-round selection (#2 overall) in the upcoming 1939 NFL draft.  The Bears then drafted future Hall of Fame quarterback Sid Luckman.  Manske re-signed with the Bears later in 1939, leaving Pittsburgh with nothing to show for its top pick.

Military career
One of 995 NFL players who served during World War II, Manske joined the Navy as a lieutenant commander. During officer training at the St. Mary's Preflight School in 1942, he also played on the team and earned All-Service All-America honors.

Coaching and teaching career
Manske began his coaching career at the College of the Holy Cross in 1941. After the war, he returned to coach at Boston University and the University of Maryland, then worked as an assistant coach for the University of California, Berkeley under Pappy Waldorf from 1947 to 1952, facing his former Northwestern team in the 1949 Rose Bowl.

Manske eventually became an educator, and taught biology at Berkeley High School from 1955 until his retirement in 1975.

Personal life and honors
Manske was married for 53 years to 1928 Olympian and 1932 Summer Olympics bronze medalist, Jane Fauntz.

In 1988 Manske was inducted into the Northwestern Athletics Hall of Fame and in 1989 he was inducted into the College Football Hall of Fame.

References

External links
 
 
 

1912 births
2002 deaths
American football ends
Boston University Terriers football coaches
California Golden Bears football coaches
Chicago Bears players
Holy Cross Crusaders football coaches
Maryland Terrapins football coaches
Northwestern Wildcats football players
Philadelphia Eagles players
Pittsburgh Pirates (football) players
Saint Mary's Pre-Flight Air Devils football players
College Football Hall of Fame inductees
United States Navy personnel of World War II
United States Navy officers
Schoolteachers from California
People from Nekoosa, Wisconsin
Players of American football from Wisconsin
20th-century American educators
Military personnel from Wisconsin